The Hamilton Steelers (known as the Hamilton Steelhawks from 2015-2022) are a senior-level ice hockey team based in Hamilton, Ontario, Canada. The team is a member of the Allan Cup Hockey league of the Ontario Hockey Association, the top tier of senior ice hockey in Ontario, and eligible for the Allan Cup national championship.

The team began play in the 2015–16 season as an expansion team. The team plays in the Andreychuk Mountain Arena.

Season-by-season record
Note: GP = Games Played, W = Wins, L = Losses, T = Ties, OTL = Overtime Losses, Pts = Points, GF = Goals for, GA = Goals against, PIM = Penalties in minutes

Source: pointstreak.com

References

External links
Official ACH website
OHA website

Ice hockey teams in Hamilton, Ontario
2015 establishments in Ontario
Ice hockey clubs established in 2015